Antonio Montilla (born 1 November 1935) is a Venezuelan former cyclist. He competed in the three events at the 1956 Summer Olympics.

References

1935 births
Living people
Venezuelan male cyclists
Olympic cyclists of Venezuela
Cyclists at the 1956 Summer Olympics
People from Trujillo (state)